Note: Gloup is common in Scottish placenames referring to a sea jet.

Gloup is a village in the far north of the island of Yell in the Shetland Islands. It lends its name to nearby island of Gloup Holm.

Gloup Holm derives its name from the village of Gloup and Gloup Voe on the "mainland" of Yell. These names derive from the Old Norse for a ravine.

In 20/21 July 1881, the Gloup Fishing Disaster occurred, in which 58 fishermen were killed by an unexpected summer storm coming from the direction of Iceland. In 1981, a hundred years after the event a memorial was erected to commemorate the victims. Ten boats were lost, mostly sixareens.

References

External links

So Much To Sea - The Gloup Disaster

Villages in Yell, Shetland